Dolzhansky (masculine), Dolzhanskaya (feminine), or Dolzhanskoye (neuter) is the name of several rural localities in Russia:
Dolzhanskaya, a stanitsa in Yeysky District of Krasnodar Krai
Dolzhanskoye, a settlement in Alekseyevsky Rural Okrug of Krasnoznamensky District of Kaliningrad Oblast